Mehrsa Baradaran (born April 3, 1978) is an Iranian-American law professor specializing in banking law at the University of California, Irvine. Baradaran is a noted proponent of postal banking to expand financial services to underserved communities. Baradaran has also stated that postal banking will not be enough to close the racial wealth gap and more recently, has proposed the necessity of a "Black New Deal."

Early life and education 
Baradaran was born on April 3, 1978 in Orumieh, Iran. In 1986, Baradaran and her family immigrated to the United States. Baradaran and her family joined the Church of Jesus Christ of Latter-day Saints (LDS) after arriving in Los Angeles. Baradaran and her younger sister Shima did not speak English when they began elementary school, but learned the language within three months of starting school. 

Baradaran spent 18 months giving service to Latino immigrants in Houston, which led to her becoming fluent in Spanish. She earned her bachelor's degree cum laude from Brigham Young University (BYU) and her J.D. degree cum laude from New York University School of Law.  She served as a member of the New York University Law Review and as an Academic Research Fellow at the New York University School of Law.

Legal career
While in private practice, Baradaran practiced law in the Davis, Polk & Wardwell financial institutions group in New York City. Baradaran went on to teach banking regulation, property, and administrative law at Brigham Young University's J. Reuben Clark Law School. 

In 2012, Baradaran joined the law faculty at the University of Georgia School of Law in 2012, where she was the J. Alton Hosch Associate Professor, teaching contracts and banking law. At the University of California, Irvine (UCI) School of Law, she has taught courses such as "Banking Law, Property, Race, Law & Capitalism" that explore the intersection of racism, inequality, and the law.

Political activity 
In November 2020, Baradaran was named a volunteer member of the Joe Biden presidential transition's Agency Review Team to support transition efforts related to the Department of Treasury and the Federal Reserve. 

In 2021, Baradaran was mentioned as a possible contender for the position of Comptroller of the Currency. Baradaran's nomination was supported by progressives in the Democratic Party, including Representative Jamaal Bowman. In the end, Cornell Law Professor Saule Omarova was chosen for the role instead. Since then, she has been mentioned as a possible candidate to serve on the Federal Reserve.

Personal life and recognition
Baradaran is married to Jared Bybee, a former president of the Clarke County Board of Education. Baradaran's sister, Shima, is a law professor at Brigham Young University: The two taught side by side in 2010. 

She spoke about her experience as a refugee from Iran in Slate in January 2017. She pointed out that she was one of the "immigrants and refugees from 'terrorist countries' that soon will be banned by executive order from coming [to America]". She concluded: "The irony for me is that it was Iran's tribalism and nationalism that put my family out in the first place. Ayatollah Ruhollah Khomeini's regime had said 'Iran First', too. They silenced the press, kicked out all the 'others', and ran the liberal intellectuals out of the country. I hope that's not what happens here. But even if it does, this is my home and I will keep working to make America great because I have so much hope in America".The Huffington Post described her as one of "a powerful cohort of Mormon women of color scholar-activists... who are powerful critics of racism, colonialism, and economic exploitation".

Bibliography 
Baradaran's first book, How the Other Half Banks: Exclusion, Exploitation, and the Threat to Democracy, was published in 2015. In the book, she proposes postal banking, an idea that was endorsed by Bernie Sanders and Elizabeth Warren. On October 15, 2015, Baradaran gave a speech on the book to the American Postal Workers Union and the National Association of Letter Carriers, where she again proposed a return to postal banking, which was discontinued in 1967.  The book has been featured in a number of publications, including the New York Times, The Atlantic, the Financial Times. 

In 2017, Baradaran published her second book, The Color of Money: Black Banking and the Racial Wealth Gap, the Harvard University Press. The book, which explores how a racially-segregated financial system built and maintained the racial wealth gap, inspired Netflix to commit $100 million to support Black communities.

References

External links

1978 births
Living people
Iranian emigrants to the United States
Latter Day Saints from Georgia (U.S. state)
American women lawyers
American lawyers
American legal scholars
Davis Polk & Wardwell lawyers
Brigham Young University alumni
New York University School of Law alumni
American women legal scholars